This is a complete list of current bridges and other crossings of the Great Miami River from its mouth at the Ohio River to its source at Indian Lake.  All locations are in Ohio unless otherwise specified. Pedestrian-only bridges are marked in italics.

Crossings 

Rivers of Ohio
Lists of river crossings in the United States